Colonel Piero D'Inzeo (4 March 1923 – 13 February 2014) was an Italian show jumping rider, winner of six medals at the Olympic Games, and an officer in the Italian cavalry. He was born in Rome.

Biography
With his younger brother Raimondo D'Inzeo, also an officer in the military (but of the Carabinieri), in the international arena they have been called the "invincible brothers" of Italian equestrianism. They participated in numerous competitions in Italy and abroad. At the Olympic Games in 1960 in Rome, Raimondo won the gold medal and Piero the silver medal in the Grand Prix jump obstacles. They were the first athletes to compete in eight Olympic games, consistently from 1948-1976. Piero won 2 silver and 4 bronze Olympic medals. He also won the European Championship title in 1959.

He died in February 2014, at the age of 90.

Achievements 
Olympic Games
1956 Stockholm: Silver medal team and individual bronze medal on Uruguay
1960 Rome: Bronze medal team and individual silver medal on The Rock
1964 Tokyo: Bronze medal team on Sun Beam
1972 Munich: Bronze medal team on Easter Light
European Championships
1958 Aachen: Individual silver medal on The Rock
1959 Paris: Individual gold medal on Uruguay
1961 Aachen: Individual silver medal on The Rock
1962 London: Individual bronze medal on The Rock
International Grand Prix wins include:
1952 Aachen on Uruguay
1958 Rome on The Rock
1959 Aachen on The Rock
1961 Aachen on The Rock
1961 Amsterdam on Sunbeam
1962 Rome on Sunbeam
1962 Dublin
1965 Aachen on Bally Black
1967 Rome on Navarette
1968 Rome on Fidux
1970 Rome on Red Fox
1973 Rome on Easter Light
1976 Rome on Easter Light

See also
List of athletes with the most appearances at Olympic Games
 Legends of Italian sport - Walk of Fame

References

External links

1923 births
2014 deaths
Italian show jumping riders
Olympic equestrians of Italy
Italian male equestrians
Olympic silver medalists for Italy
Olympic bronze medalists for Italy
Equestrians at the 1948 Summer Olympics
Equestrians at the 1952 Summer Olympics
Equestrians at the 1956 Summer Olympics
Equestrians at the 1960 Summer Olympics
Equestrians at the 1964 Summer Olympics
Equestrians at the 1968 Summer Olympics
Equestrians at the 1972 Summer Olympics
Equestrians at the 1976 Summer Olympics
Olympic medalists in equestrian
Equestrians of Centro Sportivo Carabinieri
Medalists at the 1972 Summer Olympics
Medalists at the 1964 Summer Olympics
Medalists at the 1960 Summer Olympics
Medalists at the 1956 Summer Olympics